USS Fidelity is the name of two vessels of the U.S. Navy:

  laid down 15 October 1941 by the Nashville Bridge Co., Nashville, Tennessee.
  launched 21 August 1953 by Higgins Industries, Inc., New Orleans, Louisiana.

United States Navy ship names